2001 Japanese Super Cup was the Japanese Super Cup competition. The match was played at National Stadium in Tokyo on March 3, 2001. Shimizu S-Pulse won the championship.

Match details

References

Japanese Super Cup
2001 in Japanese football
Kashima Antlers matches
Shimizu S-Pulse matches